The color of the day is a signal used by plainclothes officers of some police departments in the United States. It is used to assist in the identification of plainclothes police officers by those in uniform. It is used by the New York City Police Department and other law enforcement agencies.

A plainclothes police officer will wear a headband, wristband or other piece of clothing in the color of the day, and officers will be told of this color at the police station before they start work. The system is for officer safety and first started during the violence of the 1970s and 1980s in New York City.

Purpose 
The color of the day system is about protecting undercover officers. With so many armed officers in New York City, undercover police officers need to have an easy-to-use system to provide for discreet identification of plainclothes officers by uniformed ones.

History 
The now-defunct NYPD Street Crime Unit started in 1971. From the late 1970s through the early 1990s, crime in New York City was at record levels. Undercover officers were asked to go into the New York City Subway and other high-risk areas in plain clothes, or dressed as a homeless person or as a decoy for those victimizing at-risk groups. Many of these officers feared that uniformed officers would mistake them for criminals in a use of force situation, so the wearing of a headband or wristband colored with the color of the day system was developed to prevent friendly-fire incidents.

In popular culture 

 Color of the day is mentioned in Shawn Ryan's The Shield, Roger Abell's The Black Shields, Greg Faliis's Just the Facts Ma'am, and Leslie Glass' novel, A Killing Gift.
 In Law & Order Season 5, Episode 20, "Bad Faith," Detective Lennie Briscoe identifies the color of the day as aquamarine when making an inquiry to the DMV. 
Color of the day is mentioned in Law & Order: Special Victims Unit episodes "Birthright", "Perverted", "Gambler's Fallacy", and "Manhattan Transfer".
Color of the day is also mentioned in Blue Bloods, Season 3, Episode 19, "Loss of Faith", when Frank Reagan says that every plainclothes officer will have the color of the day in full display, Season 8, Episode 9, "Pain Killers", when Frank Reagan asks if an NYPD plain clothes officer who was shot at by a State Police officer was wearing the color of the day, and in Season 10, Episode 19, "Family Affairs", when the same Reagan identifies the color of the day as green after noticing a green wristband worn by a NYPD plainclothes officer Joe Hill.
In NYPD Blue season 6 episode 8 "Raging Bulls" an undercover officer is shot by another police officer while not wearing the color of the day (red).
In Shooter (TV series) Season 1, Episode 1, "Point of Impact", Bob Lee Swagger (played by Ryan Phillippe) recognizes a United States Secret Service agent (Isaac Johnson, played by Omar Epps) by their lapel pin which was the color of the day.
In White Collar (TV series) Season 2, Episode 4, "By the Book", the color of the day is set to orange by FBI Agent Peter Burke in a preparation meeting to arrest a Colombian crime boss.

See also 
Law enforcement in New York City

References 

Law enforcement in the United States
Law enforcement in New York City
Law enforcement techniques